Andrew Seow is a Singaporean actor, celebrity, model and media personality.

Seow was a model in Singapore and Asia before becoming an actor on local television. He is best known for his role as Gary Tay as the fiery tempered eldest son in the family drama series, Growing Up on MediaCorp TV Channel 5 and okto, earning him the Best Newcomer in the annual Asian Television Awards in 1996. Seow has also starred in numerous Chinese dramas on Channel 8, garnering several nominations in the annual Star Awards.

Education
Seow studied at Catholic High School and St. Patrick's School. He earned an Advanced Diploma in fashion design, jewellery design and merchandising from LaSalle College.

Career
Seow was talent-spotted by a Television Corporation of Singapore (TCS) producer in 1996 and subsequently joined TCS. Alongside Thomas Ong and Raymond Yong as part of the Five Dragons, Seow was groomed by the television studio.

Filmography

Television

Theatre 
2002
Close: In Your Face by The Necessary Stage

Awards and nominations

References

Singaporean people of Chinese descent
Singaporean television personalities
Singaporean male television actors
Catholic High School, Singapore alumni
Living people
Year of birth missing (living people)